Eugenio Manuel Villazón Laso (born 19 September 1972) is a Mexican professional football coach and former player, currently for Major League Soccer club Atlanta United. As an assistant coach he has won championships such as the CONMEBOL South American Cup in 2006 with Pachuca, as well as a Mexican League championship, and two CONCACAF championships in 2007 and 2008. As a soccer player he was champion three times with Toluca. He has also been in charge of the development of youth teams at the club level in Morelia and the National Team in Guatemala. His most recent experience is with Atlanta United of the MLS.

Club career
As a player, Villazón debuted in the 1994–1995 season for Toluca, where he played for almost his entire career. During his time at Deportivo Toluca, he won three Primera División championships: Verano 1998, Verano 1999 and Verano 2000. He scored 8 goals during his career. Villazón retired in 2002, after playing one season in León F.C. in promotion division.

Assistant coach career
Villazón began his coaching career in March 2003, working under Enrique Meza at Cruz Azul. Meza had previously managed Villazón when Villazón was playing for Deportivo Toluca. The next season, both coaches moved to Toluca. In June 2006, Meza was named head coach of Pachuca and brought along Villazón as an assistant coach. During their time at Pachuca, Villazón won the Copa Sudamericana, two CONCACAF Champions League Cups, one league championship, and participated twice in the FIFA Club World Cup. For the 2009–10 season, Meza and Villazón returned to Cruz Azul, where they were runners-up in the Apertura 2009 tournament and the 2009–10 CONCACAF Champions League. After that, Meza and Villazón managed Toluca for the 2012–13 season and Pachuca for the 2013–14 season.

Villazón worked as assistant coach for Morelia for the 2015–2016 season.

In February 2017, Roberto Hernández and Villazón were announced as managers of Morelia. They jointly took on the responsibility of managing Monarcas Morelia with the objective of saving the team from relegation. They managed to stay in the First Division and continued for two years in the position, until February 2019. During this period, they achieved the runner-up position in the 2017 Clausura MX Cup and qualified for three consecutive league games.

He served as an assistant coach with Toluca in 2021.

Eugenio Villazón was considered as one of the five finalist candidates to coach Guatemala's senior national team, a position that was finally assigned to Luis Fernando Tena in December 2021.

In January 2022, Eugenio Villazón joined Gonzalo Pineda's coaching staff as an assistant coach of the Major League Soccer club Atlanta United.

Executive
In January 2017, Villazón was announced as Director of Monarcas Morelia Reserves and Academy.

Between August 2019 and December 2020, he developed and lead the National Youth Soccer Teams of Guatemala project.

Honours

Player
Toluca
Mexican Primera División: Verano 1998, Verano 1999, Verano 2000

Assistant manager
Pachuca
Copa Sudamericana: 2006
CONCACAF Champions' Cup: 2007, 2008
Mexican Primera División: Clausura 2007

References

External links

1972 births
Living people
People from Mexico City
Footballers from Mexico City
Mexican footballers
Association football defenders
Deportivo Toluca F.C. players